Kfar Yam was one of the Gaza Strip Israeli Settlements abandoned in Israel's 2005 disengagement plan.

History
Kfar Yam was a small non-religious community established in 1983 populated by four families.
The community was established on abandoned land which used to be a holiday village for officers of the occupying Egyptian Army.

References

Former Israeli settlements in the Gaza Strip
Populated places established in 1983
Villages depopulated during the Arab–Israeli conflict
1983 establishments in the Palestinian territories
2005 disestablishments in the Palestinian territories